Rishra (works number 2007) was built in 1921 by Baguley Cars Ltd.  Following a working life in India it is now preserved at the Leighton Buzzard Light Railway, Buckinghamshire, England.

It is the one of only 31 Baguley steam locomotives built.

History
Baguley Cars Ltd took the order on 7 July 1919 for their works number 2007   locomotive and delivered in on 28 November 1921 to Light Railways Ltd.  

The locomotive was used by the Calcutta Corporation for shunting coal wagons at a water pumping station in Barrackpore, India.

Left abandoned in undergrowth, it was rescued in 1963 by Michael Satow, a senior executive of Imperial Chemical Industries (ICI), who had the locomotive restored at the Hooghly Docking and Engineering Company, Rishra, Kolkata (Calcutta).

It was repatriated to the Leighton Buzzard Light Railway in England by Satow in 1971. 

She is one of only four preserved locomotives fitted with Baguley valve gear, similar to the Bagnall-Price gear which was adopted by Bagnall after Ernest E. Baguley left that firm.

References

Notes

Footnotes

Sources

External links 

 

This article uses text from Festipedia under the GFDL

Preserved narrow gauge steam locomotives of Great Britain
0-4-0T locomotives
Individual locomotives of Great Britain